Jang may refer to:

Jang (Marshall Islands), part of Maloelap Atoll, in the Marshall Islands
Jang, Nepal, a village development committee in the Rapti Zone of western Nepal
 Jang, the Tibetan name for Naxi, a county-level district of Luzhou city, Sichuan Province, China
 Jang, the Tibetan name for the Naxi people living in the region of Lijiang, Yunnan
Jang (Korean name), a common Korean family name
Jang Group of Newspapers, a Pakistani newspaper publishing company
Daily Jang, an Urdu-language newspaper published by the Jang Group
 Jang Town, a town in Tawang, Arunachal Pradesh, India.
A rank bestowed by the Nizam of Hyderabad to ennobled Muslim retainers - see Khan (title)
A variety of Korean condiments, such as ganjang, doenjang, and gochujang.

See also 

 
 Dschang, a city in Cameroon